City 2 City may refer to:

City2City - former bus operator in Germany
song on the Cloud Nine (Kottonmouth Kings album)